Sharon Tay (born October 15, 1966) is an American journalist and former host of two programs on the MSNBC network and formerly a news reporter for KCBS-TV and KCAL-TV in Los Angeles before being laid off in 2020 after 13 years with the networks.

Life and career
Tay was born in Singapore and immigrated to the United States at the age of seven. Her family settled in Connecticut for several years before relocating to the Philippines. She spent her sophomore year at the International School Manila and then returned to the United States to complete her high-school education at a boarding school in Massachusetts. Tay attended Boston University, where she obtained a Bachelor of Science degree in Broadcast Journalism, with a minor in International Relations.

Tay's first big break came in Boston, where she anchored, wrote and produced a weekend news show for a local cable station. In 1993, KCCN-TV, now KION in Salinas, California, hired her as a general assignment reporter / consumer investigative reporter. Soon thereafter, Tribune Broadcasting recruited Tay for its KTLA-5 Los Angeles staff as a general assignment reporter. She went on to become a weekend anchor and, ultimately, an anchor for the early morning edition of the news.

Tay left KTLA in December 2004 in order to pursue opportunities at MSNBC. Her hosting duties at MSNBC included stints at "MSNBC at the Movies" and "MSNBC Entertainment Hot List", where she hosted the show. Tay subsequently returned to Los Angeles local news at  CBS 2 and KCAL9, the #1 prime newscast in the Los Angeles market. In November 2013, Tay was moved to KCBS-TV's morning newscast from 4:30-7:00 a.m. and the midday newscast from 11:00-11:30 a.m. In October 2018 Tay moved to KCAL9's 4pm and 9pm newscasts.

On May 27, 2020, KCBS laid off Tay. The cuts were part of a company-wide cost-cutting that comes nearly six months after the merger of Viacom and CBS, a corporate union that executives said would bring $750 million in savings.

References

External links

KCBS-TV bio

1966 births
American journalists of Chinese descent
Boston University alumni
Emmy Award winners
Living people
Television anchors from Los Angeles
Singaporean emigrants to the United States
American women television journalists
MSNBC people
American women journalists of Asian descent